Aughnacloy College is a secondary school in Aughnacloy, County Tyrone, Northern Ireland. It is in the Southern Education and Library Board area. It opened in 1963.

Secondary schools in County Tyrone
1963 establishments in Northern Ireland
Educational institutions established in 1963